Linchmere, also often spelled Lynchmere, is a village and a civil parish, the northernmost parish in the Chichester district of West Sussex, England. As well as Linchmere village, the parish contains the settlements of Hammer and Camelsdale.

Linchmere parish is bordered to the north by Haslemere in Surrey with a tributary of the River Wey as boundary, to the east by Fernhurst parish, to the south by Linch civil parish with the Shulbrede stream as boundary, and to the west by the civil parish of Bramshott in Hampshire.

In the 2001 census there were in the civil parish 836 households, with a total population of 2,225 of whom 1,127 were economically active. The population at the 2011 Census was 2,392.

Richard Dimbleby is buried in St Peter's churchyard. According to the link, he was cremated.

History
The name Linchmere was, in ancient times, spelled Wlenchemere.

The area includes the remains of an Augustinian priory founded in 1200 and at first known as Woolynchmere Priory. Its later name, Shulbrede Priory, is now attached to the priory remains (located  southwards from Linchmere village centre), to an associated  manor house, and to the peerage of Baron Ponsonby of Shulbrede.

The settlement at Hammer took its name from an iron mill which was active there from before 1573 until at least 1730. There were also other iron works in the district including one partly in what is now Fernhurst parish, in Furnace Wood near Lower Lodge Farm, apparently started a little before 1620.

References

 Ordnance Survey Explorer (scale 1:25,000) map 133 Haslemere & Petersfield

External links

Linchmere Civil Parish Council information page
British History Online:Linchmere
The priory and manor of Lynchmere and Shulbrede

Villages in West Sussex
Chichester District